Death on the Run (Italian: Bersaglio mobile), also known as Moving Target, is a 1967 Italian Eurospy film directed by Sergio Corbucci. Filmed in Athens, it was referred as a film directed with "whip-along style and dubious sense of humour".

Cast 
 Ty Hardin as Jason 
 Michael Rennie as Clark 
 Paola Pitagora as Greta 
 Vittorio Caprioli as Billy 
 Gordon Mitchell as Albanese 
 Graziella Granata as Rumba

References

External links

1967 films
Films directed by Sergio Corbucci
Italian spy thriller films
Films set in Athens
Films set in Greece
Films scored by Fiorenzo Carpi
1960s Italian-language films
English-language Italian films
1960s Italian films